Duders Hill (also Takamaiiwaho) was a 20 metre high scoria mound located on the Devonport coast, on the lower south-east slopes of Takarunga / Mount Victoria, in the Auckland volcanic field. It was mostly quarried away in the early 20th century

Geology

The hill is thought to have been a section of Mount Victoria's upper scoria cone which was rafted downslope with lava flows.

References

City of Volcanoes: A geology of Auckland - Searle, Ernest J.; revised by Mayhill, R.D.; Longman Paul, 1981. First published 1964. .
Volcanoes of Auckland: The Essential guide - Hayward, B.W., Murdoch, G., Maitland, G.; Auckland University Press, 2011.

External links
  View of Duders Hill around 1879-1884
  1880s view of Duders Hill.
 Photographs of Duders Hill held in Auckland Libraries' heritage collections.

Auckland volcanic field